The 2021 Supercupa României was the 23rd edition of the Supercupa României, an annual football super cup contested by the winners of the previous season's Liga I and Cupa României competitions. 

The game featured CFR Cluj and Universitatea Craiova, with the Arena Națională in Bucharest hosting the competition for the first time since 2014. Universitatea Craiova claimed its first Supercup after a 4–2 victory at the penalty shoot-out.

Teams

Match

Details

Statistics

References

2021–22 in Romanian football
Supercupa României
CFR Cluj matches
CS Universitatea Craiova matches